John James Shepherd (2 June 1884 – 9 July 1954) was an English tug of war competitor who competed in the 1908 Summer Olympics, in the 1912 Summer Olympics, and in the 1920 Summer Olympics for Great Britain.

He was part of the British team City of London Police which won two gold medals in 1908 and 1920 and the joint City of London Police-Metropolitan Police "K" Division British team which won a silver medal in 1912.

He was also known for supporting the wrestling styles of Cumberland and Westmorland, and earned multiple heavyweight wrestling titles locally.

References

External links
profile
Olympic profile

1884 births
1954 deaths
City of London Police officers
Tug of war competitors at the 1908 Summer Olympics
Tug of war competitors at the 1912 Summer Olympics
Tug of war competitors at the 1920 Summer Olympics
Olympic tug of war competitors of Great Britain
Olympic gold medallists for Great Britain
English Olympic medallists
Olympic silver medallists for Great Britain
Olympic medalists in tug of war
Medalists at the 1920 Summer Olympics
Medalists at the 1912 Summer Olympics
Medalists at the 1908 Summer Olympics